Blacksoil is a rural locality in the City of Ipswich, Queensland, Australia. In the  Blacksoil had a population of 104 people.

History 
Blacksoil was officially named as a locality by the Queensland Place Names Board on 1 July 1978. It was officially bounded on 8 September 2000.

In the  Blacksoil had a population of 104 people.

References 

City of Ipswich
Localities in Queensland